Andrew John Bond II (born March 19, 1961) is a former American football quarterback. He was the starting quarterback for the Mississippi State Bulldogs in 1980, 1981, 1982, and 1983. He played in the wishbone offense under head coach Emory Bellard.

College career
Bond's college career included a 6–3 win over Alabama in 1980, a game still considered by Bulldog fans to be the greatest in school history. In addition, Bond is the only quarterback in college football history to beat LSU four times., and he was also named the MVP of the 1981 Hall of Fame Bowl.

Bond is fourth in total offense on the Bulldogs' career list with 6,901 (4,621 passing and 2,280 rushing). Bond's rushing total was an SEC record for over two decades, but was eventually passed by Matt Jones of Arkansas, Tim Tebow of Florida, and Dak Prescott and Nick Fitzgerald of Mississippi State.

College statistics

Professional career
After college, Bond signed with the Saskatchewan Roughriders in 1984 but did not appear in any games. He was then drafted by the Cleveland Browns in the third round of the 1984 NFL Supplemental Draft of USFL and CFL players.

Later life
In 2010, Bond played a role in the Cam Newton eligibility controversy. Bond reported that in 2009, former Mississippi State player Kenny Rogers told him that it would take $120,000 to $180,000 to have Newton commit to the Bulldogs. Bond reported this information to the Mississippi State athletic department, who reported it to the SEC. Newton eventually signed with Auburn 

In May of 2018 he was named head football coach at St. Joseph Catholic School in Madison, Mississippi.

References

American football quarterbacks
Canadian football quarterbacks
American players of Canadian football
Players of American football from Georgia (U.S. state)
People from Valdosta, Georgia
Mississippi State Bulldogs football players
Cleveland Browns players
Saskatchewan Roughriders players
1961 births

Living people